Vyhne was a labor camp in the Slovak State that existed from 1940 to 1944. Several hundred Jews were prisoners.

References

1940 establishments in Slovakia
1944 disestablishments in Czechoslovakia
The Holocaust in Slovakia